In mathematics, Mahler's inequality, named after Kurt Mahler, states that the geometric mean of the term-by-term sum of two finite sequences of positive numbers is greater than or equal to the sum of their two separate geometric means:

when xk, yk > 0 for all k.

Proof 
By the inequality of arithmetic and geometric means, we have:

and

 

Hence,

Clearing denominators then gives the desired result.

See also 
Minkowski inequality

References 
Minkowski inequality in the Encyclopedia of Mathematics

Inequalities
Articles containing proofs